Harikesh Bahadur is a national leader of the Indian National Congress and has represented Gorakhpur (Lok Sabha Constituency) on the Congress for Democracy Party ticket in 1977 and 1980. on Lokdal Ticket.

References

Living people
Indian National Congress politicians
Lok Sabha members from Uttar Pradesh
India MPs 1977–1979
India MPs 1980–1984
People from Gorakhpur district
Year of birth missing (living people)
Lok Dal politicians
Congress for Democracy politicians
Indian National Congress politicians from Uttar Pradesh